Pectis is a genus of flowering plants in the family Asteraceae described as a genus by Linnaeus in 1759.

The name is derived from the Latin word pecten, meaning "comb." It refers to the marginally-bristled leaves or the pappus form.  These plants vary in appearance but they usually bear yellow daisy-like flower heads. Members of the genus are known generally as cinchweeds (current usage) or chinchweeds (older name).

They are native to the Americas, including the West Indies.

Species accepted by the Plants of the World Online as of December 2022:

References

External links 
 
 
 Jepson Manual Treatment
 USDA Plants Profile

 
Asteraceae genera